Latex  is a rural unincorporated community in Harrison County, Texas, United States.  It lies about 15 miles northeast of the county seat, Marshall. The community's name was derived, not from the rubber product nor the document preparation system, but from the names of the states of Texas and Louisiana (it is located near the border of the two states).

References

Unincorporated communities in Texas
Unincorporated communities in Harrison County, Texas